Delaware Water Gap is a borough in Monroe County, Pennsylvania, United States.  It is located adjacent to the Delaware Water Gap, the pass through which the Lackawanna Corridor and Interstate 80 run across the Pennsylvania-New Jersey border along the Delaware River.

The population of Delaware Water Gap was 675 at the 2020 census.

History
The Delaware Water Gap station (Delaware, Lackawanna and Western Railroad) was added to the National Register of Historic Places in 2002.

Geography
Delaware Water Gap is located at  (40.982028, -75.142624).

Demographics

As of the 2010 United States Census, there were 746 people living in the borough. The racial makeup of the borough was 81.4% White, 6.3% Black, 0.1% Native American, 3.9% Asian, 0.1% Pacific Islander and 0.9% from two or more races. 7.2% were Hispanic or Latino of any race.

As of the census of 2000, there were 744 people, 345 households, and 192 families living in the borough. The racial makeup of the borough was 92.61% White, 4.03% African American, 0.13% Native American, 1.21% Asian, 1.08% from other races, and 0.94% from two or more races. Hispanic or Latino of any race were 4.97% of the population.

There were 345 households, out of which 24.3% had children under the age of 18 living with them, 42.9% were married couples living together, 8.1% had a female householder with no husband present, and 44.1% were non-families. 31.9% of all households were made up of individuals, and 7.2% had someone living alone who was 65 years of age or older. The average household size was 2.16 and the average family size was 2.73.

In the borough the population was spread out, with 19.0% under the age of 18, 10.1% from 18 to 24, 36.2% from 25 to 44, 24.2% from 45 to 64, and 10.6% who were 65 years of age or older. The median age was 36 years. For every 100 females, there were 97.3 males. For every 100 females age 18 and over, there were 93.3 males.

The median income for a household in the borough was $37,708, and the median income for a family was $45,795. Males had a median income of $31,786 versus $26,083 for females. The per capita income for the borough was $21,641. About 8.1% of families and 8.8% of the population were below the poverty line, including 10.9% of those under age 18 and 3.4% of those age 65 or over.

Public education
The Borough is served by the Stroudsburg Area School District.

Transportation

Interstate 80 is the main highway serving Delaware Water Gap. It follows the Keystone Shortway along a northwest-southeast alignment through the borough, crossing the Delaware River into New Jersey via the Delaware Water Gap Toll Bridge. Pennsylvania Route 611 also traverses the borough, following a northwest-southeast alignment via Foxtown Hill Road and Main Street.

Happenings
 Each year in September, the Delaware Water Gap Celebration of the Arts Festival takes place. The festival showcases world-renowned jazz artists, sculptors, and painters who live in or around the town.

Climate

According to the Trewartha climate classification system, Delaware Water Gap has a Temperate Continental climate with hot summers, cold winters and year-around precipitation (Dcao). Dcao climates are characterized by at least one month having an average mean temperature ≤ , four to seven months with an average mean temperature ≥ , at least one month with an average mean temperature ≥  and no significant precipitation difference between seasons. Although most summer days are slightly humid in Delaware Water Gap, episodes of heat and high humidity can occur with heat index values > . July is the peak month for thunderstorm activity which correlates with the average warmest month of the year. The average wettest month is September which correlates with tropical storm remnants during the peak month of the Atlantic hurricane season. Since 1981, the wettest calendar day was 6.39 inches (162 mm) on 10/08/2005. Episodes of extreme cold and wind can occur with wind chill values < . The average snowiest month is January which correlates with the average coldest month of the year. Ice storms and large snowstorms depositing ≥ 12 inches (30 cm) of snow occur once every couple of years, particularly during nor’easters from December through February.

Ecology
According to the A. W. Kuchler U.S. potential natural vegetation types, Delaware Water Gap would have a dominant vegetation type of Appalachian Oak (104) with a dominant vegetation form of Eastern Hardwood Forest (25). The peak spring bloom typically occurs in late-April and peak fall color usually occurs in mid-October.

See also
Delaware Water Gap National Recreation Area
Water gap

References

External links

Populated places established in 1793
Delaware Water Gap
Boroughs in Monroe County, Pennsylvania
1793 establishments in Pennsylvania
Pennsylvania populated places on the Delaware River